The  Omaha Beef season was the team's eleventh season as a football franchise and second in the Indoor Football League (IFL). One of twenty-five teams competing in the IFL for the 2010 season, the Beef were members of the Central West Division of the United Conference. The team played their home games at the Omaha Civic Auditorium in Sioux Falls, South Dakota.

Schedule

Regular season

Standings

Playoffs

Roster

References

Omaha Beef
Omaha Beef
Omaha Beef seasons